Cycleanine is a selective vascular calcium antagonist isolated from Stephania.

External links
 Calcium antagonist properties of the bisbenzylisoquinoline alkaloid cycleanine

Calcium channel blockers
Alkaloids found in plants